Pieter Johannes Hoets (April 24, 1921 – August 28, 2014) was a Dutch Engelandvaarder, an active Dutch resistance fighter against the Nazi occupation of the Netherlands in WW-II.

World War II 
After a failed attempt to sail to England on June 19, 1940 he eventually left the country from Delfzijl on October 13, 1944. In Stockholm he signed up as a volunteer and was assigned to the Dutch Intelligence in Stockholm to interrogate new arrivals. 
After he arrived in England, he served in the Royal Netherlands East Indies Army.

Post-war 
After the war he immigrated to the US, where he studied US law at Yale University, joined The Coca-Cola Company where he became Chief Counsel for Coca Cola Europe, and later joined New York-based Reid & Priest, a law firm with 160 attorneys founded in 1935 with an office in Washington, D.C.. Hoets authored five historic books, including De Yale Connection. De jacht op de Marcos-miljarden en het Zwitsers bankgeheim ("The Yale Connection. Hunting the Marcos billions and Swiss banking secrecy.")

Death 
Hoets died on August 28, 2014 in Stamford, Connecticut the United States.

Military and Knight's Orders
 Cross of Merit (Netherlands)
 Oorlogsherinneringskruis with four stars (War Memorial Cross)
 Verzetsherdenkingskruis (Resistance Memorial Cross)
 Officer in the Order of Orange-Nassau

See also
 List of Engelandvaarders

Bibliography 
 Vrijgevaren! Met voorwoord van Erik Hazelhoff Roelfzema (1976), 
 Englandspiel ontmaskerd. Schijnstoot op Nederland en België 1942–1944 (1990), 
 Spookspoor naar Moskou (1996), 
 De Yale Connection. De jacht op de Marcos-miljarden en het Zwitsers bankgeheim. Met medewerking van Alexander Münninghoff (2000), 
 Buitengaats! Met een Engelandvaarder de wereld in (2006),

References 

1921 births
2014 deaths
Recipients of the Cross of Merit (Netherlands)
Officers of the Order of Orange-Nassau
Recipients of the Resistance Memorial Cross
Dutch resistance members
Yale University alumni
Coca-Cola people